Saint Joseph the Hymnographer was a Greek monk of the ninth century. He is one of the greatest liturgical poets and hymnographers of the Eastern Orthodox Church. He is also known for his confession of the Orthodox Faith in opposition to Iconoclasm.

As a poet he is often confused with Joseph, the Archbishop of Thessalonica and brother of Theodore the Studite, who were one generation older than he was, so that in many cases, attribution of specific hymns to him is uncertain.

Life 
He was born around 816 AD in Sicily of devout parents, Plotinus and Agatha. Joseph's family had to flee from Sicily due to the Arab invasion of the island. According to the hagiographer Theophanes they went to Peloponnese. At the age of fifteen he was tonsured a monk at the Latomos Monastery of Thessalonica. About 840 the bishop of Thessalonica ordained him a hieromonk (priest-monk). While visiting Thessalonica the distinguished Gregory of Dekapolis was so impressed with Joseph, because of his rare character, that he invited him to join his Stoudios Monastery in Constantinople.

Iconodule mission to Rome 
With the resurgence of Byzantine Iconoclasm under Leo V the Armenian and Theophilos, Joseph was sent by Gregory to Rome following an invitation of Pope Leo III in 841. While en route, Joseph was captured by slave-trading pirates and sold as a slave in Crete. In slavery St. Nicholas appeared to Joseph and asked him to sing in the name of God. Nicholas then said to him: "Arise and follow me!" Joseph found freedom soon after his vision. He could finally return to Constantinople after more than one year in slavery in Crete. Theophanes is not clear, when Joseph returned to Constantinople, but he mentioned in one paragraph a triumphal return after the death of Theophilos and the restoration of the icons, but also after the recent death of Gregory of Decapolis.

Monastic foundations 
According to the temporal reconstruction of the early vitae by Daniel Stiernon, Joseph founded a monastery dedicated to his deceased mentor, Gregory of Dekapolis, in 855. Joseph started with an inclosure together with his and Gregory's disciple John at St. Antipas. After the latter's death in 850, he spent some years in a kind of sanctuary dedicated to St. John Chrysostom, where he continued his ascetic labors and attracted followers. Joseph transferred the relics taken from Gregory's corpse, together with those from their disciple named John, and placed them in a sanctuary of his monastery's church dedicated to St. Bartholomew the Apostle.

Exile and recognition as an anachorete and saint 
In 858, he was exiled to the theme of Cherson after denouncing Caesar Bardas, brother of the Empress Theodora, for illicit cohabitation. Joseph returned again to Constantinople in 867, after Bardas had been assassinated.

Through the favour of the Patriarch Ignatius I, he was appointed skeuophylax (keeper of the sacred vessels—i.e., the official responsible for the building containing the treasure of the church) in the Great Church of Constantinople. Joseph also stood high in the favor of Patriarch Photius the Great, the rival and successor of Ignatius, and accompanied Photius into banishment. He was among those who inspired the first missionaries to Russia.

He reportedly possessed the "gift of discernment" because of which Photius appointed him the spiritual father and confessor for priests, recommending him as, "A man of God, an angel in the flesh and father of fathers." He died 3 April 886 AD according to Theophanes.

Hymnography 
Since Joseph's contribution to the Studites reform is often confused with the works of Joseph of Thessalonica, Theodore's brother, the exact attribution of poems "by Joseph" is still a controversial issue.
Tomadakes (1971) has attributed 385 canons and 9 kontakia of the menaion, 68 canons of the parakletike, 6 complete canons of the triodion and 34 triodes-tetraodes, 2 canons and 24 triodes-tetraodes of the pentekostarion to the Sicilian Joseph. He also created more than 6 canons and 13 stichera—so-called  which were not included in the new chant books of the sticherarion created by the Studites. This attribution regards Joseph more or less as the author or even inventor of the Parakletike, but earlier sources which had been recently discovered, do not confirm this view, it rather reframes the question, how the repertoire was changed and re-ordered by Joseph's initiative.

Hagiography and veneration 
Joseph the Hymnographer appears as well in Latin as in Greek hagiography. The earliest Vita was written by Theophanes who followed Joseph in his monastery as hegoumenos. There is a later synaxarion, probably of the 11th century, attributed to one John the Deacon whose exact identity is still a controversial matter.

Godfrey Henschen's edition of the synaxarion was reprinted at Patrologia Graeca. A younger Vita was written by Theodore Pediasimos during the early Palaiologan period (early 14th century).

The feast of Joseph the Hymnographer is celebrated on 3 April in the Greek tradition, on 4 April in the Slavic rite, and on 14 June in the calendar of saints of the Roman Catholic Church.

See also 
 Byzantine Music
 Gregory of Decapolis
 Heirmologion
 Octoechos and Parakletike
 Stoudios Monastery
 Sabas of Stoudios
 Sticherarion
 Theodore the Studite

References

Notes

Citations

Sources

Further reading

External links
Joseph the Hymnographer article from Orthodox Wiki.
Venerable Joseph the Hymnographer Icon and Synaxarion.
Hymn to St. Joseph the Hymnographer. Icon and chant.
Max Treu article from German Wikipedia.

Year of birth unknown
880s deaths
9th-century Byzantine writers
9th-century Christian monks
9th-century Christian saints
Byzantine hymnographers
Byzantine Thessalonian writers
Founders of Christian monasteries
People from Syracuse, Sicily
Saints of medieval Greece
Saints of medieval Macedonia
Sicilian saints